The Ishim constituency (No.178) was a Russian legislative constituency in Tyumen Oblast in 1993–2007. The constituency covered large portions of upstate Tyumen Oblast to the east of Tyumen. Currently territory of the former Ishim constituency is split between Tyumen constituency (northern part) and Zavodoukovsk constituency (southern part).

Members elected

Election results

1993

|-
! colspan=2 style="background-color:#E9E9E9;text-align:left;vertical-align:top;" |Candidate
! style="background-color:#E9E9E9;text-align:left;vertical-align:top;" |Party
! style="background-color:#E9E9E9;text-align:right;" |Votes
! style="background-color:#E9E9E9;text-align:right;" |%
|-
|style="background-color:"|
|align=left|Stanislav Shkuro
|align=left|Independent
|
|49.55%
|-
|style="background-color:"|
|align=left|Karl Ruppel
|align=left|Independent
| -
|19.20%
|-
| colspan="5" style="background-color:#E9E9E9;"|
|- style="font-weight:bold"
| colspan="3" style="text-align:left;" | Total
| 
| 100%
|-
| colspan="5" style="background-color:#E9E9E9;"|
|- style="font-weight:bold"
| colspan="4" |Source:
|
|}

1995

|-
! colspan=2 style="background-color:#E9E9E9;text-align:left;vertical-align:top;" |Candidate
! style="background-color:#E9E9E9;text-align:left;vertical-align:top;" |Party
! style="background-color:#E9E9E9;text-align:right;" |Votes
! style="background-color:#E9E9E9;text-align:right;" |%
|-
|style="background-color:"|
|align=left|Viktor Rozhkov
|align=left|Independent
|
|21.61%
|-
|style="background-color:#D50000"|
|align=left|Mirabo Uteshev
|align=left|Communists and Working Russia - for the Soviet Union
|
|16.71%
|-
|style="background-color:"|
|align=left|Lyudmila Zhelnina
|align=left|Power to the People
|
|13.71%
|-
|style="background-color:"|
|align=left|Valery Kretov
|align=left|Political Movement of Transport Workers
|
|12.05%
|-
|style="background-color:"|
|align=left|Sergey Vasilyev
|align=left|Independent
|
|5.48%
|-
|style="background-color:#1C1A0D"|
|align=left|Tamara Aksenova
|align=left|Forward, Russia!
|
|5.29%
|-
|style="background-color:"|
|align=left|Vladilen Nikitin
|align=left|Independent
|
|4.90%
|-
|style="background-color:"|
|align=left|Aleksey Vasilishin
|align=left|Liberal Democratic Party
|
|4.88%
|-
|style="background-color:"|
|align=left|Safiulla Ilyasov
|align=left|Union of Muslims of Russia
|
|2.66%
|-
|style="background-color:#019CDC"|
|align=left|Gennady Yartsev
|align=left|Party of Russian Unity and Accord
|
|1.08%
|-
|style="background-color:#A8A821"|
|align=left|Nikolay Tropin
|align=left|Stable Russia
|
|1.02%
|-
|style="background-color:#000000"|
|colspan=2 |against all
|
|8.09%
|-
| colspan="5" style="background-color:#E9E9E9;"|
|- style="font-weight:bold"
| colspan="3" style="text-align:left;" | Total
| 
| 100%
|-
| colspan="5" style="background-color:#E9E9E9;"|
|- style="font-weight:bold"
| colspan="4" |Source:
|
|}

1999

|-
! colspan=2 style="background-color:#E9E9E9;text-align:left;vertical-align:top;" |Candidate
! style="background-color:#E9E9E9;text-align:left;vertical-align:top;" |Party
! style="background-color:#E9E9E9;text-align:right;" |Votes
! style="background-color:#E9E9E9;text-align:right;" |%
|-
|style="background-color:"|
|align=left|Yury Konev
|align=left|Independent
|
|27.46%
|-
|style="background:#D50000"| 
|align=left|Anatoly Ushakov
|align=left|Communists and Workers of Russia - for the Soviet Union
|
|20.69%
|-
|style="background-color:"|
|align=left|Tamara Kazantseva
|align=left|Communist Party
|
|15.10%
|-
|style="background-color:"|
|align=left|Viktor Vitkalov
|align=left|Independent
|
|13.92%
|-
|style="background-color:"|
|align=left|Olga Shcherbakova
|align=left|Liberal Democratic Party
|
|6.08%
|-
|style="background-color:"|
|align=left|Sergey Zimnev
|align=left|Independent
|
|4.53%
|-
|style="background-color:#004BBC"|
|align=left|Boris Tarasov
|align=left|Russian Cause
|
|2.05%
|-
|style="background-color:#000000"|
|colspan=2 |against all
|
|8.40%
|-
| colspan="5" style="background-color:#E9E9E9;"|
|- style="font-weight:bold"
| colspan="3" style="text-align:left;" | Total
| 
| 100%
|-
| colspan="5" style="background-color:#E9E9E9;"|
|- style="font-weight:bold"
| colspan="4" |Source:
|
|}

2003

|-
! colspan=2 style="background-color:#E9E9E9;text-align:left;vertical-align:top;" |Candidate
! style="background-color:#E9E9E9;text-align:left;vertical-align:top;" |Party
! style="background-color:#E9E9E9;text-align:right;" |Votes
! style="background-color:#E9E9E9;text-align:right;" |%
|-
|style="background-color:#FFD700"|
|align=left|Yury Konev (incumbent)
|align=left|People's Party
|
|62.12%
|-
|style="background-color:"|
|align=left|Vladimir Chertishchev
|align=left|Communist Party
|
|13.96%
|-
|style="background-color:"|
|align=left|Andrey Koldobanov
|align=left|Liberal Democratic Party
|
|6.25%
|-
|style="background-color:"|
|align=left|Eduard Altfater
|align=left|Industrial Party (Prompartiya)
|
|2.77%
|-
|style="background-color:#000000"|
|colspan=2 |against all
|
|12.83%
|-
| colspan="5" style="background-color:#E9E9E9;"|
|- style="font-weight:bold"
| colspan="3" style="text-align:left;" | Total
| 
| 100%
|-
| colspan="5" style="background-color:#E9E9E9;"|
|- style="font-weight:bold"
| colspan="4" |Source:
|
|}

Notes

References

Obsolete Russian legislative constituencies
Politics of Tyumen Oblast